is a Japan-exclusive puzzle game based on the popular Picross game. The game is considered to be a spin-off of Sunsoft's Hebereke series. Its first release was on the PlayStation on September 8, 1995, and would later be ported onto other platforms ever since. The game has received 2 sequels. It is the only game in the Hebereke series to feature Utsuzin as the main villain, rather than Unyohn. A European version, named Oh-Chan's Logic, was planned, but was cancelled.

Plot 
O-Chan and Hebe are walking on a grass field. All of a sudden, Utsuzin suddenly captured Hebe in a UFO. O-Chan tries to run after him, but she's too late. Then she ventures to rescue Hebe from Utsuzin's lair.

The ending shows O-Chan waking from her bed, indicating (but not explaining) that it was a dream.

Gameplay 

The game presents the player with a puzzle grid. The player should chisel the grid; if done correctly, the player will win the game.

The game also has a multiplayer mode in which the player must chisel the grid in order to beat the other player.

The game even has an edit mode in which the player can create their own puzzles.

The Sega Saturn version included a story mode in which the player must verse opponents that come out of their way. The player can also complete to get better times on that mode, as they are timed.

The game has a tutorial mode, which teaches the player how to play the game.

Sequels

O-Chan no Oekaki Logic 2 
On September 27, 1996,  was released on the PlayStation. It was also ported to the WonderSwan on  January 6, 2000, though the "2" was dropped from the title, as it was the only game in the series released for that platform. The game featured new puzzles, music tracks, and updated visuals. The game also added a painting mode, in which the puzzle grid must be filled with color.

O-Chan no Oekaki Logic 3 
The game uses the same engine as the first game, featuring more levels; the game lacked the additions the second game had.

O-Chan no Oekaki desu wa 
 was released in 2004 for mobile devices. It was the final game in the Hebereke series. Little information is known about this one. As its name suggests, it is a remake of the first game.

Notes

References 

1995 video games
1996 video games
2001 video games
2004 video games
Super Nintendo Entertainment System games
Sega Saturn games
PlayStation (console) games
WonderSwan games
Palm OS games
Mobile games
Sunsoft games
Hebereke
Nonograms
Picross (video game series)
Puzzle video games
Multiplayer and single-player video games
Video games developed in Japan
Japan-exclusive video games